The 3rd Division is an infantry division of the British Army and was first formed in 1809. The division is commanded by a general officer commanding (GOC), who receives orders from a level above him in the chain of command, and then uses the forces within the division to undertake the mission assigned. In addition to directing the tactical battle in which the division is involved, the GOC oversees a staff and the administrative, logistical, medical, training, and discipline concerns of the division. Since its founding, the division has had 69 permanent GOCs over a history that has spanned more than 200 years.

Prior to 1809, the British Army did not use divisional formations. As the British military grew in size during the Napoleonic Wars, the need arose for such an implementation in order to better organise forces for administrative, logistical, and tactical reasons. The 3rd Division was formed on 18 June 1809 by Lieutenant-General Arthur Wellesley, and served in the Peninsular War (part of the Napoleonic Wars). The division's first commanding officer, Major-General John MacKenzie, was killed in action at the Battle of Talavera in 1809. After the Peninsular War ended in 1814, the division was disbanded only to be re-raised the following year when the War of the Seventh Coalition broke out. The division then fought at the Battles of Quatre Bras and Waterloo, and then marched into France where it became part of the subsequent British army of occupation. The division was broken-up, once more, in 1817. It was next raised for service in the Crimean War (1853–1856). The division was next formed to take part in the Second Boer War, in 1899. When the need for divisions subsided, the following year, the division was disbanded to provide garrisons for various static locations.

In 1902, a new 3rd Division was formed as a permanent standing formation and not raised for a particular crisis. During the 20th century, the division fought in the First and Second World Wars. Major-General Hubert Hamilton, the division's first commander during the First World War, was killed in action in 1914. During the Second World War, the division played a prominent role in the Allied invasion of German-occupied France in 1944. During that campaign, Major-General Tom Rennie was wounded in action. Following the Second World War, the division took part in the Suez Crisis, and was deployed to Cyprus in 1964, during raising tensions in the ongoing dispute over the island. In 1977, the division was converted into an armoured formation, and was deployed to Germany as part of the British Army of the Rhine. The division became a mechanised infantry formation in 1992 and was moved to the UK. During the mid-1990s, the division took part in peacekeeping operations in Bosnia and Herzegovina (Stabilisation Force in Bosnia and Herzegovina). In the 21st century, the division undertook deployments to Afghanistan and Iraq. As of late 2021, Major General James Martin commands the division.

General officer commanding

Notes

References

 
 
 
 
 
 
 
 
 
 
 
 
 
 
 
 
 
 
 
 
 
 
 
 
 
 

British Army personnel by war
British Army personnel of the Napoleonic Wars
British Army personnel of the Peninsular War
British Army personnel of the Crimean War
British Army personnel of the Second Boer War
British Army personnel of World War I
British Army personnel of World War II
British Army general officer commanding lists